Bernard Lachance (23 June 1974 – 11 May 2021) was a Canadian singer-songwriter.

Biography
Lachance had a great interest in music during his youth, starting with piano. He began studying at the Conservatoire de musique du Québec à Québec in 1989 before leaving Quebec City for Montreal to work in show business. He notably performed at the Capitole de Québec and the Molson Centre. In 1997, he founded the production labels Phénix Productions and Prospectart alongside Serge Paré. He then released his first album, Seul, with composer  and engineer Bernard Torelli. It was released in 1998 and received immediate success. However, his production studios closed soon afterwards and he severed ties with Paré.

In 2000, Lachance founded the record label Productions Ad Libitum, with Sylvain Gagné as his sole investor. He then released his second album, Ad Libitum, which sold over 100,000 copies. In 2005, he nearly signed with Universal Music Group, although the partnership did not come to fruition. He then released another album, titled While I Remember You.

In 2003, Lachance performed a solo concert at the Bell Centre, selling 4000 tickets. In 2007, he performed at Massey Hall in Toronto and at Radio City Music Hall in New York City in 2008. The following year, he signed with the record label Isba.

In 2020, Lachance appeared on  program on Le Canal Nouvelles, he alleged that AIDS is a "fraudulent, criminal and also scripted by the same actors and the same institutions as those involved in the COVID-19 pandemic". Lévesque did not broadcast the interview. Lachance then published a paper on the internet on HIV/AIDS denialism. Afterwards, he was invited to  YouTube channel to discuss the parallels between AIDS and the COVID-19 pandemic.

Bernard Lachance died on 11 May 2021, at the age of 46. On January 7, 2022, following a coroner's inquiry, it was demonstrated that Bernard Lachance died of HIV-AIDS related sepsis.

Discography
Seul (1998)
Ad Libitum (2000)
While I Remember You (2005)

References

1974 births
2021 deaths
21st-century Canadian male singers
Canadian conspiracy theorists
French Quebecers
People from Lévis, Quebec
Singers from Quebec
AIDS-related deaths in Canada
HIV/AIDS denialists
Canadian LGBT singers
Place of death missing
21st-century Canadian LGBT people
Canadian male singer-songwriters